Follow the Drinking Gourd is an African-American folk song first published in 1928. The Drinking Gourd is another name for the Big Dipper asterism.  Folklore has it that enslaved people in the United States used it as a point of reference so they would not get lost. According to legend, the song was used by a conductor of the Underground Railroad, called Peg Leg Joe, to guide some fugitive slaves.  While the song may possibly refer to some lost fragment of history, the origin and context remain a mystery.  A more recent source challenges the authenticity of the claim that the song was used to help slaves escape to the North and to freedom.

History

Texas Folklore Society and H. B. Parks 
Follow the Drinking Gourd was collected by H. B. Parks, an entomologist and amateur folklorist, in the 1910s. Parks reported that Peg Leg Joe, an operative of the Underground Railroad, had passed as a laborer and spread the song to different plantations, giving directions for slaves to escape. The song was published by the Texas Folklore Society in 1928. (The cover spells the title "Foller de Drinkin' Gou'd.")

Lee Hays 
In 1947, Lee Hays, of the Almanac Singers and The Weavers, rearranged Follow the Drinkin' Gourd and published it in the People's Songs Bulletin.  Familiar with African-American music and culture, Hays stated that he himself had heard parts of the song from an elderly black woman named Aunty Laura. Hays described the melody as coming from Aunty Laura, while the lyrics came from anthologies – probably the Parks version.

Randy Sparks/John Woodum 
In 1955, singer Randy Sparks heard the song from an elderly street singer named John Woodum.  These lyrics diverged greatly from the Parks and Hays versions and included no geographical information. Sparks later founded The New Christy Minstrels, with whom he recorded a version of the song based on Woodum's lyrics.

Meaning 

 Two of the stars in the Big Dipper line up very closely with and point to Polaris.  Polaris is a circumpolar star, and so it is always seen pretty close to the direction of true north.  Hence, according to a popular myth, all slaves had to do was look for the Drinking Gourd and follow it to the North Star (Polaris) north to freedom. James Kelley has argued against the historicity of this interpretation in the Journal of Popular Culture.

See also 
 Songs of the Underground Railroad
 Pete Seeger

Notes

External links 
 Follow the Drinkin' Gourd MP3 featuring Roger McGuinn and Nedra Talley Ross (of The Ronettes) at the Folk Den
 The New Christy Minstrels & Gene Clark-1963-Part lll  (The Muddy Road to Freedom: Follow the Drinking Gourd) Live at Fordham University

Asterisms (astronomy)
Works about American slavery
Works about the Underground Railroad
African-American spiritual songs